American singer Selena Gomez has released three studio albums since her solo debut in 2013. This has resulted in two concert tours all of them worldwide, and a lot of TV and award shows performances. During her Disney Channel days Gomez formed Selena Gomez & The Scene, her first musical group. The musical formation broke up in 2012 after ending their third and final concert tour named We Own the Night Tour. After the band's departure, Gomez has been releasing new music as a solo artist. She has been promoting all of her albums as well as her debut one Stars Dance, through 2013 and 2014, through performances at several festivals including the Rodeo Houston.

A tour in support of the album began in August 2013 and was named Stars Dance Tour. The tour was scheduled to visit Asia and Oceania between January and February 2014 but those legs were cancelled due to Gomez being diagnosed with lupus. After completion, the tour grossed over $20 million.

In November 2014 Gomez released her first compilation album which she named For You. The album included tracks from her Hollywood Records days as well as a new track named "The Heart Wants What It Wants".

In December 2014, Gomez signed with Interscope Records after releasing four studio albums with Hollywood Records. In October 2015, Gomez released her second studio album as a solo artist; Revival. The singer announced in late November that she would tour the world with a tour in support of the new album. The tour began in Las Vegas in May 2016 and ended three months later in New Zealand. The Revival Tour was expected to visit Europe in October and November 2016 before visiting Latin America the following month but got canceled in August 2016 due to the singer's anxiety and depression, both symptoms of her disease.

In 2017 Gomez started to work on her next album, her second with Interscope often referred to as SG2 on social media. Through the year she released some musical collaborations with artists like Kygo and Marshmello. She also released two singles intended to be the first one's off her new record named "Bad Liar" and "Fetish". However the release of the album was delayed and rescheduled to be released at the end of 2019. In May 2018, the singer released a new single, "Back to You" as part of the 13 Reasons Why soundtrack; a Netflix original series on which Gomez has been the executive producer since its debut in March 2017.

Concert tours

Live performances

Kiss & Tell era

A Year without Rain era

When the Sun Goes Down era

Stars Dance era

Revival era

Rare era

Other live performances

References 

Live performances
Selena Gomez